Clivina bullata is a species of ground beetle in the subfamily Scaritinae. It was described by Andrewes in 1927.

References

bullata
Beetles described in 1927